Sir Edward Joseph Brown, MBE (15 April 1913 – 27 August 1991) was a British Conservative politician.

Brown was educated at Morley College. He became a laboratory technician working with non-ferrous metals. He served as a councillor on Tottenham Borough Council from 1956 to 1962 and as chairman of the National Union of Conservative and Unionist Associations from 1959 to 1960.

Brown contested Stalybridge and Hyde in 1959. He was Member of Parliament (MP) for Bath from 1964 to 1979, preceding Christopher Patten.

In the October 1974 general election, Sir Edward held off a strong challenge from Christopher Mayhew, the Liberal MP for Woolwich East who had defected from the Labour Party. He was knighted for his trade union work before he became an MP.

References

Sources
Times Guide to the House of Commons, 1966

External links
 

1913 births
1991 deaths
Conservative Party (UK) MPs for English constituencies
Councillors in Greater London
Brown, Edward Joseph
Brown, Edward Joseph
Brown, Edward Joseph
Brown, Edward Joseph
Brown, Edward Joseph
Politics of Bath, Somerset
Knights Bachelor
Members of the Order of the British Empire